Bembidion petrosum is a species of ground beetle in the family Carabidae. It is found in North America, Europe, and temperate Asia.

Subspecies
These four subspecies belong to the species Bembidion petrosum:
 Bembidion petrosum attuense Lindroth, 1963
 Bembidion petrosum carlhlindrothi Kangas, 1980
 Bembidion petrosum petrosum Gebler, 1833
 Bembidion petrosum siebkei Sparre-Schneider, 1910

References

Further reading

 

petrosum
Articles created by Qbugbot
Beetles described in 1833